The Bilinarra, also spelt Bilingara and Bilinara, are an Aboriginal Australian people of the Northern Territory.

Language
The Bilinarra language is classified as an eastern variety of one of the Pama-Nyungan Ngumbin languages. It is mutually intelligible with Gurindji and the dialect spoken by the neighbouring Ngarinman people. Bilinarra is considered a dialect of Ngarinyman, though it shares more vocabulary with Gurindji. There are no structural features that are unique to Bilinarra and linguists would consider all three languages to be dialects of a single language, but speakers of these languages consider them to be different. Elements of their tongue were first recorded by a police constable W. H. Willshire (who was later charged with murder) in 1896. By 2013, only one person was alive who spoke it as their primary language though it inflects the variety of Kriol spoken by Bilinarra children. Bilinarra is native to the Victoria River District of the Northern Territory of Australia. The name of the language most likely refers to the surrounding country, as bili means 'rock' or 'hill', followed by an unknown suffix. Massacres by early colonists, poor treatment on the cattle stations, and mixing of languages at the cattle stations caused Bilinarra to lose prominence as more dominant languages took over, leading to the endangerment of Bilinarra.

Country
Norman Tindale estimated Bilinarra tribal land to cover some  covering the areas of the Moray Range, Delamere, and, in its southern extension, down to the Victoria River Downs and Pigeon Hole stations and the junction where the Victoria and Armstrong rivers join. Its eastern boundaries lay beyond Killarney. Numbers lived around the Billiluna Station in the 1920s. Bilinarra territory was predominantly characterized by blacksoil plains, limestone gorges and sandstone outcrops. Their neighbours are the Mudburra to the east, the Gurindji people to the southwest, and the Ngarinyman to the northwest. Most Bilinarra people now live at Pigeon Hole (Balarrgi)

Cultural practices and beliefs
In order to manufacture a gum for use in fixing tufts of flax to the bodies of dancers in their corroborees, the Bilingara used to call on one of the clan who would not be participating in the dance itself. Once handed a piece of string woven from human hair, the person who was to supply his blood used it as a ligature of his biceps, and then cut into an artery with a stone, jabbing away until an ample flow was secured, which was caught in a bark basin at his feet. What was not used for making gum was given to dingos to lap up.

Their native pharmacopeia drew on things like lemon grass (gubuwubu) and Dodonaea polyzyga (yirrigaji) for preparing a medicinal drink or lotion, mixed with a slurry of termite mound earth (mardumardu) to treat congestion, for example.

With regard to conception, the Bilinarra consider that children pre-exist their actual births, in the form of spirits that linger around an outcrop of rocks at a site called Gurdurdularni ('the place of women's children). Even the spirits of the dead (yirrmarug) may reincarnate themselves by shifting into the foetus of a pregnant woman. Numerous foods were taboo for such women, the bans being related to beliefs that such meats might damage the unborn child. Turtle (gurwarlambara) meat for example was forbidden because it was thought that, were it consumed, the child would grow up walking with a turtle-like waddle.

History of contact
The first non-Aboriginal (gardiya), that is, European, to venture into the Victoria Downs area was John Lort Stokes in 1839. The first major exploratory expedition followed in 1855-1856 when the area was surveyed by Francis Gregory and his brother Henry, and they reported favourably on its prospects for pastoral development.  In 1883 Charles Fisher and Maurice Lyons set up the Victoria River Downs Station on an area that extended over Bilingara and Karrangpurru lands.

The Bilinarra suffered from massacres during the period of their dispossession as their land was taken over for pastoral development, and even thereafter, on the stations where they sought employment, were treated harshly. Like other tribes in the area, they suffered from the standard three successive waves of colonial devastation: introduced disease, land-clearing massacres, and forced labour on the new pastoral leases. Meakins and Nordlinger state that with the establishment in 1894 of a police station run by Willshire "massacres became the officially sanctioned method of population control." Their numbers rapidly declined.

In Bilinarra oral history accounts, two massacres in particular are recorded for this early period. One group of tribesmen were rounded up and brought into the Gordon Creek police station, where they were tethered and then shot, with their bodies then burnt and dumped into a rubbish tip for cattle bones. In a further incident, a cook prepared a stew for some Bilinarra, lacing it with strychnine. Thereafter the site was named Poison Creek. Survivors eventually made their way into Ngarinman territory, where many were killed as intruders, while women were taken as wives. Those women returned to Bilinarra lands on the demise of their husbands.

Some time around 1922 a Bilinarra youth nicknamed "Banjo" killed the Billiluna station manager Condon and his white stockman, Sullivan, after the latter had abducted his woman for sexual purposes. Banjo remonstrated with the usurper, but to no effect, other than being dressed down. When the time came for the annual calf-branding, Banjo snuck into the station and, seizing a rifle on a table, shot Sullivan in the thigh, and he died of the wound soon after. He then aimed at Condon, who asked him not to shoot, and killed him. The other blacks thought of spearing him, but he had the upper hand with a rifle, and ordered some of them to report the murder to the manager of another station, while he slipped off to the Kimberley with his girl. Jack Flinders eventually tracked him down near Mary River and Louisa Downs, and shot him dead.

Bilinarra people joined Gurindji and other workers in the Wave Hill walk-off in 1967, to protest poor working conditions on the cattle station.

Alternative names
 Bilinara
 Bilinurra
 Billianera
 Bilyanarra
 Bilyanurra
 Boonarra
 Bringara
 Bulinara
 Pillenurra
 Plinara

Source:

Some words
 girrawa. (goanna)
 jamud. (bush turkey)
 jiya (kangaroo)
 yinarrwa. (barramundi)

Source:

See also
Ngumpit, a name used by the Gurindji, Malngin, Bilinara, Mudburra and Ngarinyman peoples to refer to themselves as a group

Notes

Citations

Sources

Aboriginal peoples of the Northern Territory